Traditional Day or Fête du Vodoun (literally Vodoun Festival, also known as Traditional Religions Day) is a public holiday in Benin that celebrates the nation's history surrounding the West African religion of Vodoun. The celebration is held annually on January 10 throughout the country but most notably in the city of Ouidah. Beginning with the slaughter of a goat in honor of the spirits, the festival is filled with singing, dancing and the imbibing of liquor, especially gin. Vodoun was officially declared a religion in Benin in 1996 and the festival has attracted thousands of devotees and tourists to Ouidah to participate in the festivities ever since.

Pictures

References

West African Vodun
Beninese culture
January observances
Articles containing video clips